The Monastery of the Holy Eucharist, also known as the Our Lady of Lindogon Shrine and commonly known as the Simala Shrine or the Simala Parish Church is a Roman Catholic pilgrimage church dedicated to the Virgin Mary in Sibonga, Cebu, Philippines.

History
It was built in 1998 by the Marian Monks of Eucharistic Adoration from Pampanga.

Cultural significance

The Simala Shrine is a Roman Catholic pilgrimage site. The site hosts the image of the Our Lady of Lindogon which is believed to be miraculous by devotees of the Virgin Mary after it is attributed to the healing of those who were afflicted with dengue in the area in 1998 after it reportedly shed tears. The image has reportedly shed tears four more times, the latest being on September 8, 2016.

The image, originally attributed to be that of the Our Lady of Fatima, was donated to the Marian Monks by Terry Brooks from Pampanga. The construction of the Simala Shrine is also believed to be the realization of a prediction by Ingko Niyong Villamor that the hills of Lindogon, the current site of the shrine, would become "holy" once a "miraculous white lady reign in the place".

References

Buildings and structures in Cebu
Catholic pilgrimage sites
1998 establishments in the Philippines